The Chinchilla News and Murilla Advertiser (or simply Chinchilla News) is a weekly online newspaper published in Chinchilla, Queensland, Australia.

History
The newspaper was first published on 14 December 1907. The newspaper traditionally covers the Chinchilla, Miles, Tara and Taroom districts.

Along with many other regional Australian newspapers owned by NewsCorp, the newspaper ceased print editions in June 2020 and became an online-only publication from 26 June 2020.

Ownership History 
 John Hay Braddock (1907 - 1909)
 Thomas Birkett (October 1909 - 1943)
 Frank and Harvey Fuller (1973 - 1979) 
 David and Dorothy Fuller (1980 - 1987) 
 Provincial Newspapers (QLD) (30 October 1987 - ?)

References

Newspapers published in Queensland
Weekly newspapers published in Australia
Online newspapers with defunct print editions
1907 establishments in Australia
Publications established in 1907